Tejaswi is an Indian name that may refer to 
Given name
Tejaswi Madivada (born 1991), Indian film actress and model
Tejaswi Prakash Wayangankar, Indian television actress

Surname
 Poornachandra Tejaswi (1938–2007), Kannada writer, novelist, photographer, ornithologist, publisher, painter and environmentalist 

Indian feminine given names